Jordanian Democratic Popular Unity Party ( Hizb Al-Wahdah Al-Sha'abiyah Al-Dimuqratiyyah Al-Urduniy) is a political party in Jordan. The party was formed in 1990, when the Popular Front for the Liberation of Palestine separated their branch in Jordan to become a separate party.

The party publishes Nida'a al-Watan.

See also
 List of political parties in Jordan

References

External links
JDPUP website 

1990 establishments in Jordan
Arab nationalism in Jordan
Arab Nationalist Movement breakaway groups
Arab socialist political parties
Democratic socialist parties in Asia
Left-wing nationalist parties
Palestinian nationalist parties
Political parties established in 1990
Political parties in Jordan
Popular Front for the Liberation of Palestine
Secularism in Jordan
Socialist parties in Jordan